Bangkok Bus Line 8 is a bus route in Bangkok, Thailand. Running between Happy Land Village and Memorial Bridge via Lat Phrao Road, Phahonyothin Road, and Worachak Road. It is operated by many private-joint companies. The Line 8 is notorious for reckless driving and atrocious customer service. Riders filed 345 complaints about the poor services of No. 8 buses in 2015, the highest number of BMTA complaints. On average, Bus Line 8 receives about 20 complaints per month. In informal polling, it has been ranked as the worst bus service in Bangkok.

Current route
The Line 8 operates via these primary locations:
Kheha Romklao (Air-Conditioner Bus Only)
Kheha Ramkhamhaeng (Air-Conditioner Bus Only)
Bua Khao Village (Air-Conditioner Bus Only)
Mistine Junction (Air-Conditioner Bus Only)
Triamudomsuksa Nomklao School (Air-Conditioner Bus Only)
Lamsali Intersection (Air-Conditioner Bus Only)
The Mall Bang Kapi
Vejthani Hospital
Imperial World Ladphrao
Chok Chai 4 Market
Ratchada-Ladphrao Intersection 
Lat Phrao Intersection  
Chatuchak Weekend Market  
Soi Ari 
Channel 5 (Thailand) Headquarters 
Victory Monument 
Ramathibodi Hospital
Mahidol University Phaya Thai
Saowani Junction
Yommarat
Saphan Khao
Wat Saket
Worachak Road
Sampheng
Memorial Bridge

Fares and payment method
The line is operated by several private companies under concessions from the Bangkok Mass Transit Authority (BMTA). No. 8 line bus drivers are not paid a salary, but rather are paid a percentage of each day's receipts. This motivates them to make as many runs during their shifts as possible to earn more money.

Incidents
 The BMTA punished two drivers of the No. 8 bus service for fist fighting on 14 May 2018. A dispute arose over whose bus would get more passengers. The two drivers confessed to having engaged in a fist fight, which was caught on camera and posted online by a Thai social media user. The BMTA fact-finding committee fined the driver who started the fight 5,000 baht and suspended him from work for seven days. His employer, Sap 88, was held accountable for the driver fighting in public and fined 5,000 baht. The second driver was fined 2,000 baht. Both men also received formal warnings.
 On 25 March 2016, a No. 8 bus crashed with a motorbike taxi, running over the head of the taxi's female passenger, killing her instantly. This prompted the BMTA to warn operators of No. 8 buses to improve services and ensure passenger safety or lose their concessions. BMTA officials briefed drivers and attendants of No. 8 buses at their terminals before the start of their shifts. They were told to stop at bus stops, not to race against one another, to follow traffic rules, and not to leave the slow, left lanes.
 On 23 June 2015, a No. 8 bus crashed headlong into a pickup truck, two cars, and a BTS Skytrain pillar. Two passengers and the driver sustained injuries. The driver was charged with reckless driving.
 In March 2014, a No. 8 Bus hit and crushed a motorcycle, instantly killing a 13-year-old boy.
 In 2011, a person was killed and another injured while waiting at a bus stop when a No. 8 Bus was vying with another bus for space at a bus stop.
 In October 2019, the driver of a No. 8 bus was sacked for "...slamming his way past level crossing barriers..." in Bangkok. The incident was captured in a video that went viral on social media. The bus is operated by 39 Group Ltd. which was fined 5,000 baht.

Route Map

Inclusion in Grand Theft Auto
The No. 8 bus has been created as a game mod for the popular game Grand Theft Auto (GTA). On 30 June 2015, a user uploaded an episode on YouTube which showed the bus running amok on Bangkok streets, speeding and hitting buildings, until a final collision sends the bloodied driver flying from the bus.

References

External links
 Madness and Mayhem—Bangkok's Fast & Furious Number 8 Bus (good photos)

Bus transport in Bangkok
Transport in Bangkok